Valier is a lunar impact crater that lies on the far side of the Moon. It is nearly attached to the western rim of the crater Tiselius. To the north-northwest lies the larger Sharonov, to the south-southwest is Coriolis, and west of Valier is Dufay.

The most notable feature of this crater is the satellite crater Valier J that occupies the southeastern part of the interior floor and shares part of the outer rim. The remainder of the rim is somewhat worn, with small craters along the eastern side. The inner walls of Valier are uneven slopes that are marked by several tiny craters. The surviving interior floor is a relatively level surface with some tiny craters scattered about.

Satellite craters
By convention these features are identified on lunar maps by placing the letter on the side of the crater midpoint that is closest to Valier.

References

External links
 Digital Lunar Orbiter Photo Number II-034-H2

Impact craters on the Moon